Homecoming is the tradition of welcoming back alumni or other former members of an organization to celebrate the organization's existence. It is a tradition in many high schools, colleges, and churches in the United States, Canada and Liberia.

United States
Homecoming is an annual tradition in the United States. People, towns, high schools and colleges come together, usually in late September or early October, to welcome back former members of the community. It is built around a central event, such as a banquet or dance and, most often, a game of American football, or on occasions, basketball, ice hockey or soccer. When celebrated by schools, the activities vary widely. However, they usually consist of a football game played on a school's home football field, activities for students and alumni, a parade featuring the school's choir, marching band and sports teams, and the coronation of a homecoming queen (and at many schools, a homecoming king). A dance commonly follows the game or takes place the day after the game.

When attached to a football game, homecoming traditionally occurs on the team's return from the longest road trip of the season or the first home game of a season that falls after an away game. The game itself, whether it be football or another sport, will typically feature the home team playing a considerably weaker opponent. The game is supposed to be an "easy win" and thus weaker schools will sometimes play lower division schools.

Origins

The tradition of homecoming has its origin in alumni football games held at colleges and universities since the 19th century. Many schools including Baylor, Southwestern, Illinois, and Missouri have made claims that they held the first modern homecoming. The NCAA, Trivial Pursuit and Jeopardy! give the title to the University of Missouri's 1911 football game during which alumni were encouraged to attend. It appears to be the first homecoming-like event which was centered on a parade and a football game; such was the response and success it became an annual event.

The University of Illinois at Urbana–Champaign first held its homecoming event in 1910, celebrating the 100th anniversary in 2010. This event was held annually except for 1918 and 2020, when it was first canceled because of the influenza pandemic, then because of the COVID-19 pandemic.

In 1891, the Missouri Tigers first faced off against the Kansas Jayhawks in the first installment of the Border War, the oldest college football rivalry west of the Mississippi River. The intense rivalry originally took place at neutral sites, usually in Kansas City, Missouri, until a new conference regulation was announced that required intercollegiate football games to be played on collegiate campuses. To renew excitement in the rivalry, ensure adequate attendance at the new location, and celebrate the first meeting of the two teams on the Mizzou campus in Columbia, Missouri, Mizzou Athletic Director Chester Brewer invited all alumni to "come home" for the game in 1911. Along with the football game, the celebration included a parade and spirit rally with a bonfire. The event was a success, with nearly 10,000 alumni coming home to take part in the celebration and watch the Tigers and Jayhawks play to a 3–3 tie. The Missouri annual homecoming, with its parade and spirit rally centered on a large football game is the model that has gone on to take hold at colleges and high schools across the United States.

At least two collegiate homecoming celebrations predate the University of Missouri football game homecoming event: Southwestern University, in Georgetown, Texas and Baylor University, in Waco, Texas. By multiple historical accounts, Southwestern held the first Homecoming on record on Wednesday, April 21, 1909, in San Gabriel Park. Former students raised funds, provided homes, prepared and served a barbecue supper, and decorated the town buildings. Members of the senior class waited tables.

Northern Illinois University has one of the longest-celebrated homecoming traditions in the country. The alumni football game played on Oct. 10, 1903, began NIU's homecoming tradition.

Baylor's homecoming history dates back to November 1909 and included a parade, reunion parties, and an afternoon football game (the final game of the 1909 season), a tradition that continued and celebrated its 100th anniversary in 2009. There was a gap between 1910 and 1915 when there was no homecoming event; however there has been continuity since 1915.

Traditions

Homecoming court

The backings court is a representative group of students that, in a coeducational institution, consists of a king and queen, and possibly prince(s) and princess(es). In a single-sex institution, the homecoming court will usually consist of only a king and a prince (for an all-male school) or a queen and a princess (for an all-female school), although some schools may choose to join with single-sex schools of the other gender to elect the homecoming court jointly.

Generally, the king and queen are students completing their final years of study at their school (also called "seniors"), while the prince and princess are underclassmen often with a prince/princess for each grade. Recently, some high schools have chosen to add categories, such as duke and duchess, to extend the representation of students to include a category in which students with special needs are elected. In high school, 17- or 18-year-old students in their final year are represented by a king or queen; in college, students who are completing their final year of study, usually between 21 and 23 years old.

Local rules determine when the homecoming king and queen are crowned. Sometimes, the big announcement comes at a pep rally, school assembly, or public ceremony one or more days before the football game. Other schools crown their royalty at the homecoming football game, a dance, or other school event.

Often, the previous year's king and queen are invited back to crown their successors. If they are absent for whatever reason, someone else—usually, another previous king or queen, a popular teacher, or other designated person—will perform those duties. Usually, the queen is crowned first, followed by the king. The crowning method also varies by school.

Homecoming court members who are not crowned king or queen are often called escorts or royalty. They are often expected to participate in the week's activities as well. At some schools, a homecoming prince/princess, duke/duchess, etc. (often underclassmen nominated by their classmates) are crowned along with the king and queen; sometimes, middle school and junior high students may partake in the high school activities.

Parade

Many homecoming celebrations include a parade. Students often select the grand marshal based on a history of service and support to the school and community. The parade includes the school's marching band and different school organizations’ floats created by the classes and organizations and most of the sports get a chance to be in the parade. Every class prepares a float which corresponds with the homecoming theme or related theme of school spirit as assigned by school administrators. In addition, the homecoming court takes part in the parade, often riding together in one or more convertibles as part of the parade. Community civic organizations and businesses, area fire departments, and alumni groups often participate as well. The parade is often part of a series of activities scheduled for that specific day, which can also include a pep rally, bonfire, snake dance, and other activities for students and alumni.

Tailgate

At most major colleges and universities, the football game and preceding tailgate party are the most widely recognized and heavily attended events of the week. Alumni gather from all around the world to return to their alma mater, reconnect with one another, and take part in the festivities. Students, alumni, businesses, and members of the community set up tents in parking lots, fields, and streets near the stadium to cook food, play games, socialize, binge drink, and even enjoy live music in many instances. These celebrations often last straight through the game for those who do not have tickets but still come to take part in the socializing and excitement of the homecoming atmosphere. Most tents even include television or radio feeds of the game for those without tickets.

Picnic
Sometimes during the school week, a picnic can occur. The picnic is very similar to the tailgate party, but it occurs after school or during the school's lunch period.

Dress-up days
Throughout the week, many schools (particularly high schools) engage in special dress-up days, sometimes called "Spirit Week", where students are allowed to wear clothing suitable to the theme (e.g., 1980s day, toga day, roll out of bed day, cowboy day, nerd day, pirate day, meme day, Rat Pack Day, flannel Friday, What-not-to-wear Wednesday) leading to the homecoming. Students traditionally wear clothing with their school's name, or clothing and makeup of their school's colors on Friday.

Pep rallies
Many schools hold a rally during homecoming week, often one or more nights before the game. The events vary, but may include skits, games, introduction of the homecoming court (and coronation of the king and queen if that is the school's tradition), and comments from the football players or coach about the upcoming game.

At some schools, the homecoming rally ends with a bonfire (in which old wood structures, the rival school's memorabilia and other items are burned in a controlled fire). Many colleges and high schools no longer hold bonfires because of accidents that have occurred surrounding these events in the past. The most well known accident took place in 1999, when 12 students were killed and 27 others were injured at Texas A&M University when a  pile of logs that had been assembled for a bonfire collapsed. However, this incident was not associated with homecoming—A&M is one of the few schools that do not organize a homecoming, although it has many unique traditions. The bonfire was associated with the annual rivalry game between A&M and the University of Texas.

Alumni band
The alumni band consists of former college and university band members who return for homecoming to perform with the current marching band (usually made up of recent graduates to members who graduated years or decades before) either during halftime as a full band or a featured section, e.g. the trumpet section or the tubas and drumline squads, as well as performing with the current band during the post-game concert.

Homecoming dance

The homecoming dance—usually the culminating event of the week (for high schools)—is a formal or informal event, either at the school or an off-campus location. The venue is decorated, and either a disc jockey or band is hired to play music. In many ways, it is a fall prom. Homecoming dances could be informal as well just like standard school dances. At high schools, the homecoming dances are sometimes held in the high school gymnasium or outside in a large field. Homecoming dance attire is less formal than prom. Females generally wear knee-length dresses with their hair down, and males generally wear a tucked-in dress shirt with pants. At prom, females generally wear a more formal gown that goes to the ground with hair up, and males wear suits and tuxedos.

Since most colleges are too large to facilitate a campus-wide dance, these events are usually handled instead by student organizations such as fraternities, sororities, and residential colleges. Because football and alumni events are the focal points of collegiate homecoming, dances often take place during a different week when schedules are more permitting, or not at all.

Competitions
At the high school level, students generally compete by grade level in events such as the spirit days, parade floats, and powder puff football. The competition at the collegiate level is mainly between Greek-letter organizations and, to a lesser degree, residence halls. At most larger schools, fraternities and sororities compete on parade floats, house decorations, skits, talent competitions, and service events such as blood drives or food drives. On coronation night, some schools play games between classes. Such events include the pyramid, three-legged race, pop chug, and tug of war.

Smaller school homecomings
While most schools schedule their homecoming activities around football, smaller schools that do not have a football team may plan the annual event at another time of the year. In these instances, basketball, ice hockey or soccer serves as the "big boy game" for students and alumni. Often in smaller towns with smaller populations, the parade is omitted.

At schools without athletic programs, the centerpiece event is usually a banquet, where alumni are recognized. This format is also used for alumni events of high schools that have either closed or consolidated with other high schools; the high school classes continue to meet and celebrate their years at their now-defunct alma mater. In other cases, alumni of closed schools will participate in the consolidated school's homecoming, where special recognition is often given for alumni of the once-separate schools.

Courtwarming
In some parts of the United States, high school basketball has gained a homecoming celebration of its own. Often referred to as "winter homecoming", "hoopcoming", "coronation", "snowcoming", "Colors Day", or "court warming" (the latter is especially prominent in parts of Missouri), it usually includes rallies, dress-up days, special dinners, king and queen coronations, and other winter-friendly activities typically associated with football homecoming.

Canada
Canadian homecoming weekends are often centred on a football game.

In Newfoundland and Labrador, communities have a "Come Home Year" where people who have moved away from their town come back from across Canada. In 2000, there was a provincial "Come Home Year", where many people came back to visit their various communities.

High school
Homecomings are rare in Canada, and typically only take place in high schools situated in the east of the country. Newmarket High School, London South Collegiate Institute, Banting Memorial High School, Earl Haig Secondary School and St. Michael's College School are examples of schools in Ontario known to arrange homecomings. Upper Canada College also has a longstanding homecoming tradition, although the event is referred to as "A-Day" (Association Day). St. Thomas More Collegiate in Burnaby, British Columbia hosts a Homecoming Event on the third Saturday of September.

University
Universities in Canada are also known to host Homecomings. They generally take place in September. Universities such as The University of Guelph, Western University, Concordia University, Queen's University, and The University of British Columbia have hosted homecomings in the past.

Church homecomings 
The term "homecoming" can also refer to the special services conducted by some religious congregations, particularly by many smaller American Protestant churches, to celebrate church heritage and welcome back former members or pastors. They are often held annually, but are sometimes held as one-time-only events, to celebrate the occasion.

See also
Winter Formal
 May Queen

References

External links

Reunions
Rites of passage
School terminology
Traditions
Student events
Autumn events
Student culture in the United States
Student culture in Canada